Victoria Museum may refer to:

Victoria and Albert Museum, a museum in London, England
Queen Victoria Museum (disambiguation), multiple museums
Museum Victoria, a museum in Melbourne, Australia
Tramway Museum Society of Victoria 
Victoria Jubilee Museum, Vijayawada, India
Canadian Museum of Nature in Ottawa, Canada, formerly named the Victoria Museum
Victoria Museum in Kyiv, Ukraine, a museum of historical costume and style of the Victorian era.